Hardanges is a French commune, located in Mayenne, Pays de la Loire, populated by 203 persons. The commune is part of the historic province of Maine (province).

History
The Latin form of the name . It is formed of a Germanic medieval suffix -ing (indicating property), one of few such examples in West France.

Geography
Hardanges is located 11 km from Villaines-la-Juhel and 17 km from Mayenne. The N12 road is 7 km from the commune.

Hardagnes is a rural commune, as such it is part of those communes judged "sparse or very sparse" by the French Insee.

Local culture and heritage 
Key sites and monuments include:

 St Peter's Church
 St Matthew's Chapel, built in 1775
 La Chasse-Guerre Castle
 La Butte Park
 Le Saule Mountain

The commune is home to the  motocross circuit.

See also
Communes of the Mayenne department

References

Communes of Mayenne